Clyde Kusatsu (born September 13, 1948) is an American actor and trade union leader of Japanese descent. Since 2013, he has served as the National Vice President of SAG-AFTRA Los Angeles Local.

Life and career

Clyde Kusatsu was born in Hawaii and attended Iolani School where he began acting and in Honolulu summer stock. After graduating with a theatre degree from Northwestern University, he got his first TV role on Kung Fu where was in four episodes. On M*A*S*H he played three roles in four episodes. Kusatsu also played Rev. Chong on several episodes of All in the Family. During this period Kusatsu was also a member of East West Players, the oldest Asian-American theatre company in Los Angeles.

Kusatsu has been a regular on several television series, beginning with Bring 'Em Back Alive on CBS (1982–83) and the Hawaii-set medical drama Island Son on CBS(1989–90), playing the  Richard Chamberlain character's best friend, Dr. Kenji Fushida. His many television movies have included the film adaptation of Farewell to Manzanar (1976) about Japanese-American internment during World War II. (Kusatsu also guest-starred on an episode of Lou Grant about Japanese internment in the U.S.). Other television films and mini-series have been "And The Sea Will Tell", and "American Tragedy" playing Judge Lance Ito. He was in the Baa Baa Black Sheep episode "Prisoners of War" as a downed Japanese fighter pilot in the Pacific (1976); Golden Land (1988), a Hollywood-set drama based on a William Faulkner story; and the AIDS docudrama And the Band Played On (1993). Kusatsu also had a recurring role as Vice Admiral Nakamura on Star Trek: The Next Generation. In comedy he also portrayed Principal Shimata in several episodes of the 1990s ABC situation comedy Family Matters, the usual foil of that series' main protagonist Steve Urkel. He later was in Margaret Cho's short-lived ABC series All American Girl (1994–1995), the first Asian-American family sitcom in the U.S., as Cho's character's father.
 
In films he has worked with Toshiro Mifune in Midway (1976) and again in John Frankenheimer's Black Sunday (1977) and The Challenge (1981). Kusatsu had roles in Dragon: The Bruce Lee Story (1993), In the Line of Fire (1993), and in American Pie (1999). Other films include Shopgirl as Mr. Agasa, and in Sydney Pollack's The Interpreter (2005) as Lee Wu, chief of security for the United Nations Headquarters. He also had a role opposite Glenn Close in Bruce Beresford's World War II drama Paradise Road (1997).

In soap operas he had the recurring role of Dr. Dennis Okamura on The Young and the Restless on CBS as well as guest appearances on The Bold and the Beautiful, General Hospital, and Days of Our Lives. He also appeared as four different characters on Magnum, P.I., including the Vietnamese Colonel Ki character who severely wounds Thomas Magnum (Tom Selleck), and in another two episodes he played HPD Detective Gordon Katsumoto. In the CBS Movie of the Week, he was the original Wong in "Dr. Strange" (1978).

In 2012 the Screen Actors Guild (SAG) and the American Federation of Television and Radio Actors (AFTRA), the two labor unions for actors, merged into SAG-AFTRA, and in 2013 Kusatsu became the first elected President of the new SAG-AFTRA Local in Los Angeles. He was also elected the first National Vice President Los Angeles and was re-elected to that office four times. His roles in this period include a part in The Grinder and the father-in-law of Ken Jeong's character in Dr. Ken, as well as in film, commercials, and voice-over animation, such as The Grocer in Curious George, Netflix "Blue Eye Samurai"and "Phaeton" on AMC+. Kusatsu guest-starred on the second season of Dirty John: The Betty Broderick Story. He was Grandpa Ted in Season 2 of Netflix "Never Have I Ever", and was in episodes of "Young Rock," "Days Of Our Lives," and "The United States of Al".

Filmography

Film

Television

Video games

References

External links
 
 Clyde Kusatsu 2008 interview on Asiance Magazine online
 Clyde Kusatsu 2013 interview with BlankmanInc

1948 births
Living people
American male film actors
American male television actors
American male voice actors
American male actors of Japanese descent
American film actors of Asian descent
ʻIolani School alumni
Northwestern University School of Communication alumni
Male actors from Hawaii
20th-century American male actors
21st-century American male actors